Creatinine is a breakdown product of creatine phosphate from muscle and protein metabolism. It is released at a constant rate by the body (depending on muscle mass).

Biological relevance
Serum creatinine (a blood measurement) is an important indicator of kidney health, because it is an easily measured byproduct of muscle metabolism that is excreted unchanged by the kidneys. Creatinine itself is produced via a biological system involving creatine, phosphocreatine (also known as creatine phosphate), and adenosine triphosphate (ATP, the body's immediate energy supply).

Creatine is synthesized primarily in the liver from the methylation of glycocyamine (guanidino acetate, synthesized in the kidney from the amino acids arginine and glycine) by S-Adenosyl methionine. It is then transported through blood to the other organs, muscle, and brain, where, through phosphorylation, it becomes the high-energy compound phosphocreatine. Creatine conversion to phosphocreatine is catalyzed by creatine kinase; spontaneous formation of creatinine occurs during the reaction.

Creatinine is removed from the blood chiefly by the kidneys, primarily by glomerular filtration, but also by proximal tubular secretion. Little or no tubular reabsorption of creatinine occurs. If the filtration in the kidney is deficient, blood creatinine concentrations rise. Therefore, creatinine concentrations in blood and urine may be used to calculate the creatinine clearance (CrCl), which correlates approximately with the glomerular filtration rate (GFR). Blood creatinine concentrations may also be used alone to calculate the estimated GFR (eGFR).

The GFR is clinically important as a measurement of kidney function. However, in cases of severe kidney dysfunction, the CrCl rate will overestimate the GFR because hypersecretion of creatinine by the proximal tubules will account for a larger fraction of the total creatinine cleared. Ketoacids, cimetidine, and trimethoprim reduce creatinine tubular secretion and, therefore, increase the accuracy of the GFR estimate, in particular in severe kidney dysfunction. (In the absence of secretion, creatinine behaves like inulin.)

An alternate estimation of kidney function can be made when interpreting the blood plasma concentration of creatinine along with that of urea. BUN-to-creatinine ratio (the ratio of blood urea nitrogen to creatinine) can indicate other problems besides those intrinsic to the kidney; for example, a urea concentration raised out of proportion to the creatinine may indicate a prerenal problem such as volume depletion.

Counterintuitively, supporting the observation of higher creatinine production in women compared to men, and putting into question the algorithms for GFR that do not distinguish for sex accordingly, women have higher muscle protein synthesis and higher muscle protein turnover across the life span. As HDL supports muscle anabolism, higher muscle protein turnover links increased creatine to the generally higher serum HDL in women as compared to serum HDL in man and the HDL associated benefits like reduced incidence of cardiovascular complications and reduced COVID-19 severity.

Antibacterial and potential immunosuppressive properties
Studies indicate creatinine can be effective at killing bacteria of many species in both the Gram positive and Gram negative as well as diverse antibiotic resistant bacterial strains. Creatinine appears not to affect growth of fungi and yeast; this can be used to isolate slower growing fungi free from the normal bacterial populations found in most environmental samples.  The mechanism by which creatinine kills bacteria is not presently known.  A recent report also suggests that creatinine may have immunosuppressive properties.

Diagnostic use
Serum creatinine is the most commonly used indicator (but not direct measure) of renal function. Elevated creatinine is not always representative of a true reduction in GFR. A high reading may be due to increased production of creatinine not due to decreased kidney function, to interference with the assay, or to decreased tubular secretion of creatinine. An increase in serum creatinine can be due to increased ingestion of cooked meat (which contains creatinine converted from creatine by the heat from cooking) or excessive intake of protein and creatine supplements, taken to enhance athletic performance. Intense exercise can increase creatinine by increasing muscle breakdown. Dehydration secondary to an inflammatory process with fever may cause a false increase in creatinine concentrations not related to an actual kidney injury, as in some cases with cholecystitis. Several medications and chromogens can interfere with the assay. Creatinine secretion by the tubules can be blocked by some medications, again increasing measured creatinine.

Serum creatinine 
Diagnostic serum creatinine studies are used to determine renal function. The reference interval is 0.6–1.3 mg/dL (53–115 μmol/L). Measuring serum creatinine is a simple test, and it is the most commonly used indicator of renal function.

A rise in blood creatinine concentration is a late marker, observed only with marked damage to functioning nephrons. Therefore, this test is unsuitable for detecting early-stage kidney disease. A better estimation of kidney function is given by calculating the estimated glomerular filtration rate (eGFR). eGFR can be accurately calculated without a 24-hour urine collection using serum creatinine concentration and some or all of the following variables: sex, age, weight, and race, as suggested by the American Diabetes Association. Many laboratories will automatically calculate eGFR when a creatinine test is requested. Algorithms to estimate GFR from creatinine concentration and other parameters are discussed in the renal function article.

A concern as of late 2010 relates to the adoption of a new analytical methodology, and a possible impact this may have in clinical medicine.  Most clinical laboratories now align their creatinine measurements against a new standardized isotope dilution mass spectrometry (IDMS) method to measure serum creatinine. IDMS appears to give lower values than older methods when the serum creatinine values are relatively low, for example 0.7 mg/dL. The IDMS method would result in a comparative overestimation of the corresponding calculated GFR in some patients with normal renal function. A few medicines are dosed even in normal renal function on that derived GFR. The dose, unless further modified, could now be higher than desired, potentially causing increased drug-related toxicity. To counter the effect of changing to IDMS, new FDA guidelines have suggested limiting doses to specified maxima with carboplatin, a chemotherapy drug.

A 2009 Japanese study found a lower serum creatinine concentration to be associated with an increased risk for the development of type 2 diabetes in Japanese men.

Urine creatinine
Males produce approximately 150 μmol to 200 μmol of creatinine per kilogram of body weight per 24 h while females produce approximately 100 μmol/kg/24 h to 150 μmol/kg/24 h. In normal circumstances, all this daily creatinine production is excreted in the urine.

Creatinine concentration is checked during standard urine drug tests. An expected creatinine concentration indicates the test sample is undiluted, whereas low amounts of creatinine in the urine indicate either a manipulated test or low initial baseline creatinine concentrations. Test samples considered manipulated due to low creatinine are not tested, and the test is sometimes considered failed.

Interpretation
In the United States and in most European countries creatinine is usually reported in mg/dL, whereas in Canada, Australia, and a few European countries, μmol/L is the usual unit. One mg/dL of creatinine is 88.4 μmol/L.

The typical human reference ranges for serum creatinine are 0.5 mg/dL to 1.0 mg/dL (about 45 μmol/L to 90 μmol/L) for women and 0.7 mg/dL to 1.2 mg/dL (60 μmol/L to 110 μmol/L) for men. The significance of a single creatinine value must be interpreted in light of the patient's muscle mass.  Patients with greater muscle mass have higher creatinine concentrations.

The trend of serum creatinine concentrations over time is more important than absolute creatinine concentration.

Serum creatinine concentrations may increase when an ACE inhibitor (ACEI) is taken for heart failure and chronic kidney disease. ACE inhibitors provide survival benefits for patients with heart failure and slow the disease progression in patients with chronic kidney disease. An increase not exceeding 30% is to be expected with ACEI use. Therefore, usage of ACEI should not be stopped unless an increase of serum creatinine exceeded 30% or hyperkalemia develops.

Chemistry
In chemical terms, creatinine is a lactam and an imidazolidinone, so a spontaneously formed cyclic derivative of creatine.

Several tautomers of creatinine exist; ordered by contribution, they are:
2-Amino-1-methyl-1H-imidazol-4-ol (or 2-amino-1-methylimidazol-4-ol)
2-Amino-1-methyl-4,5-dihydro-1H-imidazol-4-one
2-Imino-1-methyl-2,3-dihydro-1H-imidazol-4-ol (or 2-imino-1-methyl-3H-imidazol-4-ol)
2-Imino-1-methylimidazolidin-4-one
2-Imino-1-methyl-2,5-dihydro-1H-imidazol-4-ol (or 2-imino-1-methyl-5H-imidazol-4-ol)

Creatinine starts to decompose around 300 °C.

See also
Cystatin C, novel marker of kidney function
Jaffe reaction, an example of creatinine assay methodology
Rhabdomyolysis, may be diagnosed using creatinine levels
Nephrotic syndrome

References

External links

Guanidines
Metabolism
Nephrology
Renal physiology
Imidazolidines